Simmering is a food preparation technique by which foods are cooked in hot liquids kept just below the boiling point of water (lower than ) and above poaching temperature (higher than ). To create a steady simmer, a liquid is brought to a boil, then its heat source is reduced to a lower, constant temperature.

In food preparation 
Simmering  ensures gentler treatment than boiling to prevent food from toughening and/or breaking up. Simmering is usually a rapid and efficient method of cooking. Food that has simmered in milk or cream instead of water is sometimes referred to as creamed.

Japanese cuisine 
In Japanese cuisine, simmering is often considered one of the four essential cooking techniques, along with grilling, steaming, and deep frying.

American cuisine 
Food prepared in a crockpot is simmered. Examples include stews, chili, soups, etc.

Bulgarian cuisine 
Bulgarian traditional food, especially tender meat dishes are often simmered for extended periods of time. Examples include stews, soups, Vanyas, etc.

Dutch and Flemish cuisine 

In traditional Dutch and Flemish cuisine, less tender cuts of beef are simmered for several hours to obtain carbonade flamande. Traditionally a small flame is used, fed by burning oil. On modern stoves, the source of heat is put very low, or a simmering plate is used to diminish the heat. Usually a cast iron pan is used with a thick bottom. The meat is ready if it can be easily torn apart into threads.

Persian cuisine 
Simmering is one of the most popular styles of cooking in Iran and Afghanistan. In traditional Persian cuisine, almost all types of Persian Khoresh are simmered for several hours. That is also the case with some other Iranian dishes like Abgoosht, Bozbash, etc.

Modern stoves 
Some modern gas ranges are equipped with a simmering burner, with such burners usually located at the rear of the range. Many electric ranges have a simmer setting.

Slow cookers 
Slow cookers are countertop electrical appliances used to simmer foods for hours at a time.

References 

Cooking techniques
Culinary terminology